Prugger is a surname. Notable people with the surname include:

 Lydia Prugger (born 1969), Austrian ski mountaineer
 Thomas Prugger (born 1971), Italian snowboarder